Thomas Scheuring (born 13 December 1981) is a German former professional footballer who played as a defender.

Career 
Scheuring was born in Göppingen, Baden-Württemberg. Having been released by AC Omonia he signed for VfR Aalen on 28 May 2009.

References

External links 
 

1981 births
Living people
People from Göppingen
Sportspeople from Stuttgart (region)
German footballers
Footballers from Baden-Württemberg
Association football defenders
3. Liga players
Cypriot First Division players
VfL Kirchheim/Teck players
SSV Reutlingen 05 players
AC Omonia players
VfR Aalen players
SV Waldhof Mannheim players
German expatriate footballers
German expatriate sportspeople in Cyprus
Expatriate footballers in Cyprus